Bourahim Jaotombo (born 19 September 1992) is a Malagasy professional footballer who plays as a forward for CNaPS Sport and the Madagascar national team.

He played at the 2018 COSAFA Cup where he scored two goals.

International goals
Scores and results list Mozambique's goal tally first.

References

1992 births
Living people
Malagasy footballers
Madagascar international footballers
Association football forwards
AS Adema players
CNaPS Sport players
People from Diana Region